Thomas McKissick Jones (December 16, 1816 – March 13, 1892) was a prominent Tennessee politician. He was born in Person County, North Carolina. He later moved to Tennessee and served in the state House of Representatives and the state Senate. He was elected to represent the state in the Provisional Confederate Congress from 1861 to 1862. After the war he served as a state court judge from 1872 to 1873.

External links
http://politicalgraveyard.com/bio/jones8.html

1816 births
1892 deaths
Deputies and delegates to the Provisional Congress of the Confederate States
Members of the Confederate House of Representatives from Tennessee
19th-century American politicians